Atwan is an Arabic surname, it may refer to:
 Abdel Bari Atwan (born 1950), Palestinian journalist
 Atwan Al Atwani (born 1973), Iraqi politician
  (born 1940), American writer

Arabic-language surnames